The British Virgin Islands competed at the 2010 Commonwealth Games held in Delhi, India, from 3 to 14 October 2010.

The British Virgin Islands was represented by two athletes: Tahesia Harrigan in athletics, and Joe Chapman in squash.

See also
 2010 Commonwealth Games

References

Nations at the 2010 Commonwealth Games
British Virgin Islands at the Commonwealth Games
2010 in British Virgin Islands sport